Timothy "Tim" Davies (born 1977) is a Welsh athlete who specialises in mountain and fell running.

Tim was raised into a family with a farming background and was heavily influenced by the hills surrounding him during his childhood.

Davies was fifth in the World Mountain Running Trophy in 2003, also winning a silver medal at the 2004 European Mountain Running Championships in the team event alongside Andi Jones and John Brown. At the European Mountain Running Championships 2006 he finished in seventh position in the individual race, just behind Jones.

Davies is a three-time winner of the Snowdon Race and in 2010 he won the British Fell Running Championships.

Tim is a former Royal Marine and runs a farm on the Welsh/English border.

References

Living people
Welsh male long-distance runners
British fell runners
British male mountain runners
1977 births